Route 220 is a provincial highway located in the Estrie region of Quebec. The highway runs from Sainte-Anne-de-la-Rochelle at the junction of Route 243 and ends west of downtown Sherbrooke at Autoroute 410. The road connects the northern section of the Mont Orford Park.

Municipalities along Route 220
 Sainte-Anne-de-la-Rochelle
 Bonsecours
 Orford
 Sherbrooke (Rock Forest–Saint-Élie–Deauville)

See also
 List of Quebec provincial highways

References

External links
 Official Transports Quebec Road Network Map 
 Route 220 on Google Maps

220
Transport in Sherbrooke